Charles Oliver Bond Davis (c.1818 – 28 June 1887) was a New Zealand interpreter, writer and land purchase agent. He was born in Sydney, New South Wales, Australia on c.1818.

Davis worked as a Māori language interpreter during the signing of the Treaty of Waitangi in 1840.

In January 1868, he stood in a by-election in the City of Auckland East electorate for the Auckland Provincial Council. He was beaten by William John Hurst.

He was buried at Waikumete Cemetery in Glen Eden.

References

1818 births
1887 deaths
Interpreters
Australian emigrants to New Zealand
New Zealand writers
19th-century translators
Burials at Waikumete Cemetery